Mennoville Mennonite Church is a historic Mennonite church in El Reno, Oklahoma.

It was built in 1894 and was added to the National Register in 1979.

References

Mennonite churches in Oklahoma
Churches on the National Register of Historic Places in Oklahoma
Churches completed in 1894
Buildings and structures in Canadian County, Oklahoma
National Register of Historic Places in Canadian County, Oklahoma